In Finland, the usual way of writing dates in normal text is with the months spelled out. The format varies according to the language used. The month can also be written first, now in genitive case (the day and the abbreviated word , 'day', are in essive case as above): . In Swedish, the full stop is not used and the month is in nominative (without inflection): .

The date can be preceded by the weekday (also lower case), in Finnish in essive case: , . The Finnish language has month names differing from most other languages; three letter abbreviations are not used in Finnish, and the months are not capitalised in either language (they are not considered proper names). In spoken Finnish in a context where it is clear people may say the short form of the month e.g.  for  'October', but never in formal writing as several months also can be times of the year e.g.  'December' whereas  is yule or Christmastide;  'June' is similar to  'summer'.

 
The all-numeric form for dates is in the order day–month–year, using a full stop as the separator – for example: 31.5.2002 or 31.5.02. Years can be written with two or four digits, after the turn of the millennium usually with four, and numbers may be written with or without leading zero. The numeric form is often used in lists, letterheads, etc. A form with a stroke is also common in Swedish, especially in handwritten text: 31/5 2002 or 31/5 -02. The weekday may be prepended: .

The ISO 8601 notation (2002-05-31) is not used in normal text in Finland, but it is understood and used in some other contexts (mostly machine-generated).

The week begins with a Monday and week 1 is the week containing the year's first Thursday.

Time in Finland often uses the 12-hour clock in the spoken language and idiomatic expressions. 24-hour notation is used in writing, with a full point as the standardised and recommended separator (e.g. 15.07 or 8.27). However, a colon is almost exclusively used instead of a full point in computing environments, especially in Sámi languages. The conventions are the same for Finnish and Swedish.

References

Time in Finland
Finland